The Ordinary Boys are an English indie rock band from Worthing, West Sussex. Originally a hardcore outfit named Next in Line, they are influenced by punk rock and Britpop music, as well as the bands the Clash, the Specials, the Jam, the Kinks and the Smiths. Their name derives from a Morrissey song, "The Ordinary Boys". The membership of the band that originally split up in 2008 consisted of founding members Samuel Preston (vocals, rhythm guitar) – generally known simply by his surname "Preston", William Brown (lead guitar), James Gregory (bass), plus Simon Goldring (drums) who had replaced Charlie "Chuck" Stanley in 2005.
In October 2015, they returned with a new self-titled album on their own imprint label Treat Yourself. A 25-date UK tour from mid-October 2015 to mid-November 2015 to promote the album followed.

Career

Success
In 2004, the Ordinary Boys released their debut album Over the Counter Culture preceded by the single "Maybe Someday". The title track "Over the Counter Culture" was featured on the soundtrack for the video game Burnout 3: Takedown. In support of the album, they embarked on tours supported by the Kaiser Chiefs, the Cribs and Hard-Fi.

In 2005, they released their second album Brassbound along with the single "Boys Will Be Boys". The single didn't become a hit until 2006 as their popularity grew particularly due to media coverage that Preston received when participating in Channel 4's Celebrity Big Brother UK in January 2006, where he also met Chantelle Houghton, who he subsequently married and then divorced. During this time, Boys Will Be Boys was re-released and reached No. 3 on the UK Singles Chart and No. 1 on the UK Download Chart.

Following this, they released singles "Nine2Five" and "Lonely at the Top" to further top 10 success. In October 2006, they released their third album, How to Get Everything You Ever Wanted in Ten Easy Steps, which marked a change of sound, with more of a commercial pop feel, featuring synthesisers and samples. "I Luv U" was released as the final single from the album and became their 4th consecutive top 10 hit.

The Ordinary Boys have always maintained a very close relationship with an ultra-loyal fanbase, which reverently named itself "The Ordinary Army" and a feature of many Ordinary Boys live shows is the Ordinary Army turning out in large numbers and often displaying a large flag bearing the band's logo and the legend "Ordinary Army - On Manoeuvres".  The Ordinary Boys are well known for drinking with the Army before and after shows, in a way that many rock observers may consider rare and this is one of the aspects of the band that their fans consider mark them out from other artists as special.  In 2007 the Ordinary Boys issued a special fans-only white vinyl single, a cover of the Buzzcocks hit What Do I Get?'.  The first words Preston spoke on the band taking the stage at their latest reunion gig in December 2013 were to acknowledge the Ordinary Army with, "We've been expecting you...".

Yahoo! UK revealed that The Ordinary Boys was the fourth most searched for keyword of 2006 in their annual top ten search results.

The song Boys Will Be Boys featured in the fifth Harry Potter film, Harry Potter and the Order of the Phoenix. The band was also referenced in episode five ("Smoke and Mirrors") of series two of The IT Crowd.

At the peak of their popularity, the Ordinary Boys had successful tours of Japan and a Number One hit in that country with Boys Will Be Boys and also toured extensively at different times supporting Morrissey, Paul Weller and The Who. also appearing on Later... with Jools Holland and one of the last editions of Top of the Pops.

Split
In early 2008, Preston confirmed the band's split through the Ordinary Boys website, and announced he was writing new material for a solo album.  Though it was completed in 2009, the album release was shelved and Preston then started a songwriting career. Two of the tracks recorded for the album later surfaced on YouTube.  The Ordinary Boys' final live performance at this point had been an appearance at the Ben and Jerry's Summer Sundae outdoor event on Clapham Common on 27 July 2008.

Between 2008 and 2011, Preston embarked on a career writing and joint-writing songs for other artists and notable successes were the Number One hit Heart Skips a Beat for Olly Murs, along with Don't Say Goodbye, On My Cloud and Just for Tonight also for Olly Murs, Hard to Love Somebody for Arlissa Feat.Nas, Beautiful for Kylie Minogue and Enrique Iglesias, Goodnight Goodbye for John Newman and Lighthouse and Wait for Me for Lucy Spraggan's major label debut album Join the Club, which Sam Preston completely co-produced (bar two songs) with James Flannigan.

Sam Preston's song Dressed to Kill was covered by long-established American artist Cher on her 2013 album Closer to the Truth and she also named her tour in support of the album Dressed to Kill.

Reunion
A revived Ordinary Boys reunited in December 2011 for a full UK tour of small venues.  Preston stated at the time that his objective had been "...to give this band the decent burial that they didn't get in 2008".  Although they gave the project their blessing there was no involvement from either William Brown or James Gregory who were unavailable through other commitments and the band recruited three new members to join with original member Samuel Preston and drummer at the time of split Simon Goldring. They had also recorded one new song, called Run This Town. and played it on the tour, as well as playing live versions on their Facebook page.  James Gregory made a guest appearance at the Islington Academy show on this tour, playing on one song, Maybe Someday.

The Ordinary Boys reunited on 13 December 2013 to play a one-off gig at the Hoxton Bar and Grill in Shoreditch, London.  This reunion featured the return of James Gregory on bass and Alex Kershaw of Exeter band the Computers on guitar in place of the previous reunion members.

On 28 December 2013, Sam Preston announced that the Ordinary Boys were to officially reform, this time with Yorkshireman Louis Jones, formerly of power pop band Spectrals on lead guitar and featuring the return of original drummer Charlie Stanley for Simon Goldring who was working on a new musical project.  He has also stated that the Ordinary Boys would record again and they toured the UK with eleven live dates from 18 to 28 November 2014.

On 19 August 2014, the Ordinary Boys new lineup played a well-received and sold out first show at the Birthdays venue in Dalston, London as a warm-up for the Autumn tour.

On 18 November 2014, the band set out on a new UK tour starting in Manchester and taking in Manchester, Newcastle, Glasgow, Leeds, Birmingham, Nottingham, London, Bristol and Southampton.

Later albums and singles
In July 2015, the band announced that they would release their fourth album, the eponymously titled The Ordinary Boys, on 2 October 2015 via. their own imprint label Treat Yourself. A single, Four Letter Word, was released in July on 7-inch vinyl and CD single and they also issued I'm Leaving You (and I'm Taking You With Me) on a split 7-inch with American band Mixtapes.

In March 2021, The Ordinary Boys teamed up with Mini Murphy (Ranking Junior from The Special Beat and the version of The Beat signed to DMF Music in 2016) to record a tribute to Murphy's father, The Beat's Ranking Roger (who had died on 26 March 2019 at the age of 56). The resulting double-A side single, with Legacy on one side and Jump And Skank on the other, was released as a download, vinyl and CD single by United Sound Records/Proper.

Discography

Albums

Singles

The music videos for "Boys Will Be Boys", "Life Will Be the Death of Me", "9 to 5" and "Lonely at the Top" were all directed by Andy Hylton.

References

 
English indie rock groups
Musical groups established in 2002
Musical groups disestablished in 2008
2002 establishments in England
Musical groups from West Sussex